Cranberry Run is a tributary of Catawissa Creek in Columbia County, Pennsylvania, in the United States. The stream is considered to be a Coldwater Fishery. The main rock formations in the stream's watershed are the Mauch Chunk Formation and the Pocono Formation and the main soils are the Leck Kill soil and the Hazleton soil.

Course
Cranberry Run begins on Catawissa Mountain in Beaver Township. It flows northeast in a valley for over a mile, getting within several hundred feet of the border between Columbia County and Schuylkill County. The stream eventually turns roughly north, crosses Bunker Hill Road, and flows between Catawissa Mountain and Bunker Hill, getting further from the county line. After crossing Cranberry Run Road, it turns northeast and reaches its confluence with Catawissa Creek after a few hundred feet.

Tributaries
Cranberry Run has no tributaries, named or unnamed.

Hydrology
It also experiences some form of pollution. The stream is highly acidic and affected by acidic precipitation. Its pH is 5.8 and the total concentration of alkalinity is 0 milligrams per liter. The cranberry bogs at the headwaters of the stream may contribute to its acidity. The concentration of water hardness in the stream is 4 milligrams per liter.

The specific conductance of the stream is 22 umhos.

Geography and geology

The lower reaches of Cranberry Run are on rock of the Mauch Chunk Formation. The upper reaches of the stream is on rock of the Pocono Formation. The lower reaches of the stream are on Leck Kill soil and the rest of the stream is on Hazleton soil.

A small hill known as Bunker Hill is located near Cranberry Run. Catawissa Mountain is also in the vicinity of the stream. Very few areas along the stream are prone to flooding.

Cranberry Run has a high gradient of 86.8 meters per kilometer. It is also a small stream, with a width of 2.7 meters.

Watershed, history, and etymology
A large portion of the watershed is in Beaver Township, Columbia County. However, a small area of it is in Roaring Creek Township, Columbia County and a substantial portion is in North Union Township, Schuylkill County. The headwaters of the stream are in Pennsylvania State Game Lands Number 58, as are part of the rest of the stream. Most of the watershed is forested, but there is some agricultural land in the lower reaches of the watershed.

Ten percent of the length of Cranberry Run is within 100 meters of a road. 15 percent of the stream's length is within 300 meters of a road and 19 percent is within 500 meters of one. In 1990, the population density of the watershed was 10 people per square kilometer.

Cranberry Run is very close to Klingermans Run and the two streams have similar geologies and land uses.

Cranberry Run is in the United States Geological Survey quadrangle of Shumans.

Cranberry Run's name comes from the fact that it is in the vicinity of a marsh and that cranberries were historically grown near the stream.

Biology
Cranberry Run is considered by the Pennsylvania Department of Environmental Protection to be a coldwater fishery. However, no fish have been observed in the stream and it is incapable of supporting fish life due to acid precipitation. Wild brook trout have historically inhabited the stream.

There are natural cranberry bogs in the headwaters of Cranberry Run.

See also
Klingermans Run, next tributary of Catawissa Creek going downstream
Crooked Run (Catawissa Creek), next tributary of Catawissa Creek going upstream
List of tributaries of Catawissa Creek

References

Rivers of Columbia County, Pennsylvania
Tributaries of Catawissa Creek
Rivers of Pennsylvania